George Edward Dawson (19 March 1799 – 3 May 1843) was an English professional first-class cricketer, who played first-class cricket from 1827 to 1836.  Born in Sheffield, Yorkshire, he was mainly associated with Sheffield Cricket Club, and made eight known appearances in first-class matches.

He died in Sheffield in May 1843.

References

1799 births
1843 deaths
English cricketers
English cricketers of 1826 to 1863
Sheffield Cricket Club cricketers